Long before 1500, much of modern Nigeria was divided into states identified with contemporary ethnic groups. These early states included the Igbo Kingdom of Nri, the Benin Kingdom, the Yoruba city-states including the Kingdom of Ife, Igala Kingdom, the Hausa States, and Nupe. Numerous small states to the west and south of Lake Chad were absorbed or displaced in the course of the expansion of Kanem, which was centered to the northeast of Lake Chad. Bornu, initially the western province of Kanem, became independent in the late 14th century. Other states probably existed, but the absence of archaeological data prevents accurate dating.

Early History 

Archaeological research, pioneered by Charles Thurstan Shaw, has shown that people were already living in south-eastern Nigeria (specifically Igbo Ukwu, Nsukka, Afikpo and Ugwuele) 100,000 years ago. Excavations in Ugwuele, Afikpo and Nsukka show evidence of long habitations as early as 6,000 BC. However, by 9th century AD, it seemed clear that the Igbos had settled in Igboland. Shaw's excavations at Igbo-Ukwu revealed a 9th-century indigenous culture that created highly sophisticated work in bronze metalworking, independent of any Arab or European influence and centuries before other sites that were better known at the time of discovery.

The earliest known example of a fossil human skeleton found anywhere in West Africa, which is 13,000 years old, was found at Iwo-Eleru in Isarun, western Nigeria and attests to the antiquity of habitation in the region. The Dufuna canoe was discovered in 1987 a few kilometers from the village of Dufuna, not far from the Komadugu Gana River, in Yobe State, Nigeria.  Radiocarbon dating of a sample of charcoal found near the site dates the canoe at 8,000 to 8,500 years old. It is the oldest boat to be discovered in Africa and the second oldest known worldwide.

The Nok Culture and early Iron Age 
Evidence of iron smelting has been excavated at sites in the Nsukka region of southeast Nigeria in what is now Igboland: dating to 2,000 BC at the site of Lejja and to 750 BC and at the site of Opi. The Nok civilisation of Central Nigeria flourished between 1,500 BC and AD 200, producing life-sized terracotta figures that are some of the earliest known sculptures in Sub-Saharan Africa, and included human heads, human figures, and animals. The Nok culture smelted iron by at least 500 BC and likely earlier. Based on stylistic similarities with the Nok terracottas, the bronze figurines of the Yoruba kingdom of Ife and those of the Bini kingdom of Benin are believed to be continuations of the traditions of the earlier Nok culture.

Kingdom of Nri 
The Nri Kingdom in the Awka area was founded in about 900 AD in north central Igboland, and is considered the oldest kingdom in Nigeria. The Nsukka-Awka-Orlu axis is said to be the oldest area of Igbo settlement and therefore, homeland of the Igbo people. It was a center of spirituality, learning, and commerce. They were agents of peace and harmony whose influence stretched beyond Igboland. The Nri people's influence in neighboring lands was especially in southern Igalaland and the Benin Kingdom in the 12th to 15th centuries. As great travelers, they were also business people involved in the long distant trans-Saharan trade. The development and sophistication of this civilization is evident in the bronze castings found in Igbo Ukwu, an area of Nri influence. The Benin Kingdom became a threat in the 15th century under Oba Ewuare. Since they were against slavery, their power took a downturn when the slave trade was at its peak in the 18th century. The Benin and Igala slave raiding empires became the main influence in their relationship with western and northern Igbos, their former main areas of influence and operation. Upper northwest Cross River Igbo groups like the Aro Confederacy and Ohafia peoples, as well as the Awka and Umunoha people used oracular activities and other trading opportunities after Nri's decline in the 18th century to become the major influences in Igboland and all adjacent areas.

Edo kingdom

During the 15th century, Benin was the first to receive foreign traders. 

Edoland established a community in the Yoruba-speaking area east of Ubini before becoming a dependency of Benin Kingdom at the beginning of the 14th century. By the 15th century it became an independent trading power, blocking Ife's access to the coastal ports as Oyo had cut off the mother city from the savanna. Political and religious authority resided in the oba (king) who according to tradition was descended from Oduduwa the first ooni of ife. Benin spread over a large area enclosed by concentric rings of earthworks. By the late 15th century Edo Kingdom was in contact with Portugal who traded resources (palm oil, cotton etc.). At its apogee in the 16th and 17th centuries, Edo encompassed parts of southeastern Yorubaland and the western parts of the present Delta State.

Yoruba and Benin kingdoms

Historically the Yoruba have been the dominant group on the west bank of the Niger. They were the product of periodic waves of migrants. The Yoruba were organized in patrilineal groups that occupied village communities and subsisted on agriculture. From about the 8th century, adjacent village compounds, called Ilé, coalesced into numerous territorial city-states in which clan loyalties became subordinate to dynastic chieftains. The earliest known of these city states formed at Ilé-Ifẹ̀ and Ijebuland.  Urbanization was accompanied by high levels of artistic achievement, particularly in terracotta and ivory sculpture and in the sophisticated metal casting produced at Ilé-Ifẹ̀. The Yoruba placated a luxuriant pantheon headed by an impersonal deity, Olorun, and included lesser deities who performed various tasks. Oduduwa was regarded as the creator of the earth and the ancestor of the Yoruba kings. According to myth, Oduduwa founded Ife and dispatched his sons to establish other cities, where they reigned as priest-kings. Ile Ife was the center of as many as 400 religious cults whose traditions were manipulated to political advantage by the Ooni of Ilé-Ifẹ̀ (king). 

The oni was chosen on a rotating basis, from a branch of the ruling dynasty. Once a member was selected, they were secluded from the rest. Below the oni, in the state there were: palace officials, town chiefs, and rulers of outlying dependencies. The Ife model of government was adapted at Oyo. Eventually, Oyo turned into a constitutional monarchy, but this was not the actual government. Unlike the other Yoruba subgroups, the Oyo had cavalry forces. This helped develop trading further north.

Northern kingdoms of the Sahel

Trade was the key to the emergence of organized communities in the savanna portions of Nigeria. Prehistoric inhabitants adjusting to the encroaching desert were widely scattered by the third millennium BC, when the desiccation of the Sahara began. Trans-Saharan trade routes linked the western Sudan with the Mediterranean since the time of Carthage and with the Upper Nile from a much earlier date, establishing avenues of communication and cultural influence that remained open until the end of the 19th century. By these same routes, Islam made its way south into West Africa after the 9th century AD.

By then a string of dynastic states, including the earliest Hausa states, stretched across the western and central Sudan. The most powerful of these states were Ghana, Gao, and Kanem, which were not within the boundaries of modern Nigeria but indirectly influenced the history of the Nigerian savanna. Ghana declined in the 11th century but was succeeded by Mali Empire which consolidated much of the western Sudan in the 13th century. Following the breakup of Mali, a local leader named Sonni Ali founded the Songhai Empire in the region of middle Niger and the western Sudan and took control of the trans-Saharan trade. Sunni Ali seized Timbuktu in 1468 and Jenne in 1473, building his regime on trade revenues and the cooperation of Muslim merchants. His successor Askiya Mohammad Ture made Islam the official religion, built mosques, and brought Muslim scholars, including al-Maghili, the founder of an important tradition of Sudanic African Muslim scholarship, to Gao. Although these western empires had little political influence on the Nigerian savanna before 1500, they had a strong cultural and economic impact that became more pronounced in the 16th century, especially because these states became associated with the spread of Islam and trade. Throughout the 16th century much of northern Nigeria paid homage to Songhai in the west or to Bornu, a rival empire, in the east.

Kanem-Bornu Empire

Bornu's history is closely associated with Kanem, which had achieved imperial status in the Lake Chad basin by the 13th century. Kanem expanded westward to include the area that became Bornu. The mai (king) of Kanem and his court accepted Islam in the 11th century, as the western empires also had done. Islam was used to reinforce the political and social structures of the state although many established customs were maintained. Women, for example, continued to exercise considerable political influence.

The mai employed his mounted bodyguard and an inchoate army of nobles to extend Kanem's authority into Bornu. By tradition the territory was conferred on the heir to the throne to govern during his apprenticeship. In the 14th century, however, dynastic conflict forced the ruling group and its followers to relocate in Bornu, where as a result the Kanuri emerged as an ethnic group in the late 14th and 15th centuries. The civil war that disrupted Kanem in the second half of the 14th century resulted in the independence of Bornu.

Bornu's prosperity depended on the trans-Sudanic slave trade and the desert trade in salt and livestock. The need to protect its commercial interests compelled Bornu to intervene in Kanem, which continued to be a theater of war throughout the 15th and into the 16th centuries. Despite its relative political weakness in this period, Bornu's court and mosques under the patronage of a line of scholarly kings earned fame as centers of Islamic culture and learning.

Hausa states

By the 11th century some Hausa states - such as Kano, Katsina, and Gobir - had developed into walled towns engaging in trade, servicing caravans, and the manufacture of various goods. Until the 15th century these small states were on the periphery of the major Sudanic empires of the era. They were constantly pressured by Songhai to the west and Kanem-Bornu to the east, to which they paid tribute. Armed conflict was usually motivated by economic concerns, as coalitions of Hausa states mounted wars against the Jukun and Nupe in the middle belt to collect slaves or against one another for control of trade.

Islam arrived to Hausaland along the caravan routes. The famous Kano Chronicle records the conversion of Kano's ruling dynasty by clerics from Mali, demonstrating that the imperial influence of Mali extended far to the east. Acceptance of Islam was gradual and was often nominal in the countryside where folk religion continued to exert a strong influence. Nonetheless, Kano and Katsina, with their famous mosques and schools, came to participate fully in the cultural and intellectual life of the Islamic world. The Fulani began to enter the Hausa country in the 13th century, and by the 15th century they were tending cattle, sheep, and goats in Bornu as well. The Fulani came from the Senegal River valley, where their ancestors had developed a method of livestock management based on transhumance. Gradually they moved eastward, first into the centers of the Mali and Songhai empires and eventually into Hausaland and Bornu. Some Fulbe converted to Islam as early as the 11th century and settled among the Hausa, from whom they became ethnically indistinguishable. There they constituted a devoutly religious, educated elite who made themselves indispensable to the Hausa kings as state advisers, Islamic tribunes, and teachers.

References